also well known as Takakoshi-yama Castle is the remains of a castle structure in Ibara, Okayama Prefecture, Japan. The castle was built in the Nanboku-chō period against a possible invasion of Kublai Khan's force.

It has been said that Hōjō Sōun was born in the castle and he lived in the castle until he started serving the Ashikaga Shogunate. After the fall of the Ise clan, Takakoshi castle was controlled by the Mōri clan.

References

Castles in Okayama Prefecture
Historic Sites of Japan
Former castles in Japan
Ruined castles in Japan
Mōri clan